Robert Leon Berman (January 24, 1899 – August 2, 1988) was a Major League Baseball catcher who played in two games for the Washington Senators in . He did not get an at bat in his short major league career, but did make two putouts as a catcher. He was Jewish. He attended Fordham University.

References

External links

1899 births
1988 deaths
Fordham University alumni
Washington Senators (1901–1960) players
Major League Baseball catchers
Baseball players from New York (state)
Jewish American baseball players
Jewish Major League Baseball players
20th-century American Jews
Burials at Gate of Heaven Cemetery (Hawthorne, New York)